Lars Iver Strand (born 7 May 1983) is a Norwegian footballer who last played for Sandefjord as an attacking midfielder.

Strand got his debut for Tromsø IL on 2 May 2001. He got his debut for the national team on 22 January 2005. Strand signed a 4-year contract with Vålerenga on 12 November 2007.

Career statistics

References

External links
Strand profile at www.til.no 
Strand profile at Norwegian FA 

1983 births
Living people
Norwegian footballers
Norway international footballers
Tromsø IL players
Vålerenga Fotball players
Strømsgodset Toppfotball players
Sandefjord Fotball players
Eliteserien players
Norwegian First Division players
Association football midfielders
People from Porsanger
Sportspeople from Troms og Finnmark